Irena Fleissnerová (born 25 November 1958 in Plzeň) is a retired breaststroke swimmer from the Czech Republic, who won two gold medals at the 1979 Summer Universiade in Mexico City, Mexico. She represented Czechoslovakia at the 1980 Summer Olympics in Moscow.

References
 

1958 births
Living people
Czech female swimmers
Czech female breaststroke swimmers
Olympic swimmers of Czechoslovakia
Swimmers at the 1980 Summer Olympics
Sportspeople from Plzeň
Czechoslovak female swimmers
Universiade medalists in swimming
Universiade gold medalists for Czechoslovakia
Universiade silver medalists for Czechoslovakia
Universiade bronze medalists for Czechoslovakia
Medalists at the 1979 Summer Universiade
Medalists at the 1981 Summer Universiade